Vernon Edgar ("Ed") Howard was a Texan politician who served in the Texas House of Representatives for District 1 from 1969 to 1975 and the Texas Senate for District 1 from 1979 to 1986.

Early Years and Education
Howard was born on April 13, 1937, in Hot Springs, Arkansas to Verna Elisha Howard and Ruth Moryne (nee Jackson) and moved to Texas at a very early age. He graduated from Greenville High School in 1955, where he was a basketball star and involved in student government . He later attended Abilene Christian College and graduated in 1959 with a bachelor's degree in Business Administration. He then continued his education at Southern Methodist University, where he received his master's degree in Political Science.

Politics
Nicknamed "Honest Ed," Howard served in both the Texas House of Representatives and Texas Senate.

Texas House of Representatives 
Howard served in the Texas House of Representatives from 1969 to 1975. While in office, he was selected "Who's Who in American Politics," "Who's Who in the South," and was instrumental in the passage of key legislation in education and city services that earned him the award "Outstanding Young Legislator."

Texas Senate 
After serving three terms in the Texas House, he was elected to the Texas Senate in 1978, where he served from 1979 to 1986. 

Howard's major areas of concern were wiretapping, insurance, industrial revenue bonds, and revisions in the method of financing our colleges and universities. Living in Texarkana, with three states bordering his district, Howard was also interested in strengthening interstate compacts between Texas and neighboring legislatures. 

He served as Vice-Chairman and Chairman of the Sunset Advisory Commission. He served on the Interstate Oil Compact Commission and was twice selected a delegate to the Southern Regional Education Board. 

In April 1985, he announced his resignation to become a lobbyist.

Committees

Family and Personal Life 
He married Jo Ann Jay in 1960. He became very successful in the business world with his wife. 

 They had four children: Eric, Jay, Lee, and Katie. 

An animal lover, Howard went hunting with a group of friends every year; however, his actual purpose was to fire off rounds but not hit the deer so as to make them wary during the hunting season; in ten years of such conservation-oriented hunting, he did not succeed in killing one animal and maintained a close bond of friendship with his hunting buddies who said that he "just can't hit the broadside of a barn."

Death 
He died on July 2, 1998, at the age of 61 of throat cancer. He was buried in the Texas State Cemetery at Austin, Travis County, Texas, USA.

 He is survived by his wife, children, and ten grandchildren.

References

1937 births
1998 deaths
Members of the Texas House of Representatives
20th-century American politicians